Bush Library may refer to:

George Bush Presidential Library, the presidential library of George H. W. Bush
George W. Bush Presidential Center, the presidential library of George W. Bush